James Ullman may refer to:

 James Ramsey Ullman (1907–1971), American writer and mountaineer
 James Michael Ullman (1925–1997), American novelist and newspaper writer and editor